Paul Hanley and Nathan Healey were the defending champions but they competed with different partners that year, Hanley with Wayne Arthurs and Healey with Jordan Kerr.

Healey and Kerr lost in the first round to Bob Bryan and Mike Bryan.

Arthurs and Hanley lost in the quarterfinals to Yves Allegro and Rainer Schüttler.

Jonas Björkman and Todd Woodbridge won in the final 7–6 (7–3), 7–5 against the Bryans.

Seeds
Champion seeds are indicated in bold text while text in italics indicates the round in which those seeds were eliminated.

 Bob Bryan /  Mike Bryan (final)
 Jonas Björkman /  Todd Woodbridge (champions)
 Mark Knowles /  Daniel Nestor (first round)
 Wayne Arthurs /  Paul Hanley (quarterfinals)

Draw

References
 Main Draw

2004 Adidas International
2004 ATP Tour